Salamboreia or Salamboria, also called Salaberina and Salambriai, was a town of ancient Cappadocia, in the district Garsauritis, inhabited in Roman and Byzantine times. 

Its site is located near Kepez Tepe, Asiatic Turkey.

References

Populated places in ancient Cappadocia
Former populated places in Turkey
Populated places of the Byzantine Empire
Roman towns and cities in Turkey
History of Aksaray Province